The Transylvanian Plateau is a plateau in central Romania.

Description
The plateau lies within and takes its name from the historical region of Transylvania, and is almost entirely surrounded by the Eastern, Southern and Romanian Western branches of the Carpathian Mountains. The area includes the Transylvanian Plain.

The plateau has a continental climate. Temperature varies a great deal in the course of a year, with warm summers contrasted by very cold winters. Vast forests cover parts of the plateau and the mountains.

Subdivisions
The Transylvanian Plateau is divided into three areas:
 (Podișul Someșan or Podișul Someșelor); the northern part.
Transylvanian Plain (Câmpia Transilvaniei); the central part.
 (Podișul Târnavelor); the southern part.

The Transylvanian Plain is also hilly (400–600 m), but because the area is almost completely cultivated it is called a plain.

The Transylvanian Basin
The Transylvanian Basin includes the Transylvanian Plateau and the peripheral areas towards the Carpathian Mountains, which have a different character than the plateau. The basin is the main production site of Romania's methane. It also contains a salt dome.

See also
 Romanian Carpathians

References

External links
 

Plateaus of Romania
Physiographic provinces
Southern Carpathians
Basins of Europe